Joy Is Coming is the fifth studio album by Israeli blues and jazz guitarist Guy King. the album was released in 2021 and featured songwriting by David Ritz. Guitarist Josh Smith shared producing credits with Guy King.

Background
The album has been called autobiographical. Guy King co wrote seven of the tracks with songwriter David Ritz (writer of the Marvin Gaye song Sexual Healing) Ritz encouraged King to write the songs about personal experiences. The first single which was releases is titled "Devil's Toy" and features blues guitarist Joe Bonamassa. The album includes 10 original songs.

Release and reception
The album was released on May 28, 2021. Mike O’Cull from Rock and Blues Muse reviewed the album in May of 2021 and he said this about the album: "...high-level musicianship that also has massive crossover potential." He went on to say, "Every moment of Joy Is Coming is vital and entertaining". Brant Buckley from American Blues Scene stated, "Joy is Coming is a soulful and inspiring compilation of songs, straight from the heart". Dan Forte of Vintage Guitar said the album was "...cool soul grooves peppered with tasty blues guitar."

Personnel
Josh Smith and guy King - Producers
Guy King and David Ritz - Song writing 
Guy King - Vocals
Guy King Lead guitar, Rhythm guitar
Joe Bonamassa - guitar (Devil's Toy)
Tom Vaitsas: piano, organ, keyboards
Joshua Ramos: bass
Samuel Jewell: drums, percussion
Marques Carroll: trumpet, flugelhorn
Anthony Bruno: tenor saxophone, baritone saxophone
Vanessa Bell Armstrong: vocals (Up, Up, Up)

Tracks
 Joy is Coming
 Devil's Toy (featuring Joe Bonamassa)
 Choices
 Sanity
 Hole in My Soul
 Oh, Sarah
 Don't Do It (If You Don't Want To Do It)
 Up, Up, Up (featuring Vanessa Bell Armstrong)
 A Prayer for Me
 Looking for You

References

External links
Guy King - Devil's Toy

2021 albums
Guy King albums